Dihydrolipoamide is a molecule oxidized by dihydrolipoyl dehydrogenase in order to produce lipoamide. Lipoamide is subsequently used as a cofactor for α-ketoglutarate dehydrogenase, the pyruvate dehydrogenase complex, and branched-chain α-ketoacid dehydrogenase complex.

See also
 Dihydrolipoic acid
 Lipoic acid

References

Carboxamides
Thiols